Operation Fremont was a US Marine Corps operation that took place during the Vietnam War  The operation was carried out in tQuang Tri and Thua Thien Provinces, from 10 July 1967 to 31 October 1967.

References

Fremont
United States Marine Corps in the Vietnam War
Battles and operations of the Vietnam War in 1967